The Sistema Nacional de Creadores de Arte (SNCA; National System of Art Creators) is program developed by the former Consejo Nacional para la Cultura y las Artes, and founded per presidential decree on September 3, 1993. Its goal is the advancement and acceptance of creative activities as an essential part of national identity. It is Mexico's most prestigious arts' grant and a majority of Mexico's most notable architects, fiction writers, poets, essayists, painters, photographers, visual artists, screenwriters, filmmakers, and others who have rendered outstanding services through their work to the creative identity of Mexico, have belonged or currently belong to the program. To apply to the Sistema Nacional de Creadores de Arte, artists must be over 35 years in age and have received both domestic and internacional recognition for their work.

The grant program of the SNCA includes bourses paid by the Fondo Nacional para la Cultura y las Artes (FONCA).

References 

Arts organizations based in Mexico
Mexican art
1993 establishments in Mexico
Arts organizations established in 1993